Joseph Henry Beeman (November 17, 1833 – July 31, 1909) was a slave owner and officer in the Confederate States Army during the Civil War. He later served a term as a U.S. Representative from Mississippi from 1891 to 1893.

Biography
Born near Gatesville, North Carolina, Beeman moved with his parents to Morgan County, Alabama, in 1847 and to Mississippi in 1849. He received an academic education, teaching for several years. Beeman then engaged in mercantile pursuits.

Civil War 
He served as a lieutenant in the Confederate States Army during the Civil War. He served as member of the State house of representatives from 1883 to 1891. Beeman connected with the Farmers' Alliance and served as chairman of its executive committee. He served as delegate to several State conventions.

Congress 
Beeman was elected as a Democrat to the Fifty-second Congress (March 4, 1891 – March 3, 1893). He was not a candidate for reelection in 1892.

Later career and death 
Beeman engaged in agricultural pursuits until his death near Lena, Mississippi on July 31, 1909. He was interred in Beeman Cemetery, Lena, Mississippi.

Notes

References

 Beeman, Joseph Henry Dictionary of North Carolina Biography.

1833 births
1909 deaths
People from Gates County, North Carolina
Democratic Party members of the United States House of Representatives from Mississippi
Democratic Party members of the Mississippi House of Representatives
19th-century American politicians
People from Lena, Mississippi
Confederate States Army officers